The FAW Welsh Trophy is a knock-out football competition contested annually by teams from Wales and the borders.

The Football Association of Wales is the organising body of this competition, which has been run every year since its inception in 1890–91 (except during the two World Wars) for clubs competing in the lower echelons of the Welsh football league system.

It was known as the Welsh Junior Cup until 1902, when it became the Welsh Amateur Cup, a title it held until 1974, when it was renamed the FAW Intermediate Cup. The competition took its current title in 1993.

Eligible clubs

In order to play in this competition a club must compete at Level 3 or below of the Welsh football league system.

Teams playing in and below Welsh Football League Division 2, the Mid Wales Football League, the Welsh Alliance League and Welsh National League (Wrexham Area) are eligible to enter.

All applying clubs must also meet the Competition Ground Criteria requirements.

Winners from outside Wales

Just like the Welsh Cup, the FAW Trophy was once open to clubs from the Marches and an English club took the trophy out of Wales on nine occasions:

 1897: Coppenhall (Staffordshire)
 1899: Oswestry United Reserves (Shropshire)
 1900: Wellington St Georges United (Shropshire)
 1921: Northern Nomads (Manchester)
 1925: Northern Nomads (Manchester)
 1964: Donnington Wood (Shropshire)
 1971: Bridgnorth Town (Shropshire)
 1974: Whitchurch Alport (Shropshire)
 1975: Donnington Wood (Shropshire)

Winners

Performance

Performance by club

References

 
3
Welsh Amateur Cup seasons